Eben Etzebeth (born 29 October 1991) is a South African professional rugby union player who currently plays for the South Africa national team and Sharks in the United Rugby Championship. His regular playing position is as a number 4 lock.

Club career

Western Province and Stormers

Etzebeth was marked out as a player of huge promise from an early age when playing for Hoërskool Tygerberg in Cape Town and he entered the Western Province youth structures in 2009, featuring in the Under-18 Craven Week tournament. In 2011, his career moved up a gear when he was part of the  side which won the Varsity Cup, however injury stalled his progress in the second half of the year and he was unable to play any part in the 2011 Currie Cup.

His injury didn't stop him from being named in the Stormers squad for the 2012 Super Rugby season.

International commitments kept him out of the early stages of the 2012 Currie Cup, but he returned at the tail-end of the tournament, winning his first 3 Western Province caps and helping them to lift their first Currie Cup title since 2002.

Injury ruled Etzebeth out of the first half of the 2013 Super Rugby season, but he returned for the second half of the campaign, playing 8 matches and scoring 1 try. He also won a team-high 47 lineouts and effected 8 steals on opposition throws. For the 2013 Currie Cup, Etzebeth was again missing for large chunks of the season due to Springbok commitments, however he once again returned for the final 3 matches of the season. This time he was unable to stop the Sharks from regaining the Currie Cup by turning the tables on Western Province with a 33–19 win in Cape Town.

The first 6 months of 2014 saw Etzebeth a foot injury sustained while on international duty in November 2013 ruled him out of the entire campaign. He remained committed to both of his Cape Town-based sides and in April 2013, he signed a deal that would keep him tied to Western Province and the Stormers until 2016.

Etzebeth was yellow-carded following a fight with Blues loose forward Akira Ioane in 2017.

NTT Docomo Red Hurricanes

In July 2015, he signed a deal to play for NTT DoCoMo Red Hurricanes in the Japanese Top League.

Toulon

In December 2018, Top 14 side  announced Etzebeth would join them after the 2019 Rugby World Cup. In January 2021, he made a start at Blindside Flank for the first Time after teammate Swan Rebbadj got injured prior to kick off.

Sharks

In February 2022, the Sharks (rugby union) signed Etzebeth on a long term contract until 2027. Etzebeth would continue playing for Toulon before leaving at the end of the season.

International career

South Africa U20s

Eben Etzebeth was a member of the South Africa Under 20 team that competed in the 2011 IRB Junior World Championship in Italy where the Baby Boks finished in a disappointing 5th place.

Springboks

Etzebeth was called up to the Springbok squad for the first time by new head coach Heyneke Meyer ahead of the three match series against England in June 2012.

He made his first appearance in the second row alongside fellow debutant Juandré Kruger on 9 June 2012 at Kings Park Stadium, Durban. South Africa were victorious by 22–17. Despite suffering from some injury setbacks along the way, Etzebeth has maintained his position as first choice in the number 4 jersey throughout his Springbok career. By the end of the 2014 Rugby Championship he had made 29 appearances for his national team and is yet to score a try. Uniquely he has made more international appearances than he has Super Rugby and Currie Cup appearances combined. He also debuted for South Africa before he had played any Vodacom Cup or Currie Cup rugby for Western Province.

On 23 November 2013 he was nominated for the 2013 IRB Player of the Year award along with Leigh Halfpenny, Sergio Parisse, Kieran Read and Ben Smith. He has very impressive upper body strength for a man of his huge height and young age, being able to bench press , and perform incline dumbbell chest presses with  dumbbells as of 2018.

Etzebeth was selected by the Springboks in the 31-man squad for the 2015 Rugby World Cup, making an appearance in every one of the team's pool matches, including one off the bench in South Africa's historic 32–34 loss to Japan. After starting in the rest of the pool matches, Etzebeth started in the quarter-final win against Wales and semi-final 18-20 narrow loss to New Zealand. On 30 October 2015, with the Springboks having been knocked out of the chance to win the World Cup, Etzebeth started in a locking partnership with retiring captain Victor Matfield against Argentina for the Bronze Final. Etzebeth played the full 80 minutes of the bronze final and scored a try in the 43rd minute, helping South Africa to win third place in the competition.

Etzebeth played his 50th test for South Africa, against Australia in round 3 of the 2016 Rugby Championship and became the youngest South African player in history to reach the milestone, being only 24 years old at the time. The match was a disappointment for the Springboks and for Etzebeth, who was yellow-carded in the 41st minute of their 17–23 loss against the Wallabies.

After captaining the Springboks to beat France 35–12 in the final match of a three-test series between the two sides, Etzebeth was named as captain of the Springboks for the 2017 Rugby Championship, replacing newly appointed captain Warren Whiteley who was ruled out of the competition with an injury sustained in the second test of the French series. Whiteley failed to recover prior to the end of the 2017 season so this saw Etzebeth carry a huge workload for South Africa in 2017, playing the full 80 minutes of every match in the 2017 Rugby Championship and three-test French series. Etzebeth's 2017 campaign included what was arguably the best performance of his career in a narrow 24–25 loss to New Zealand in Cape Town.

After playing the full 80 minutes in South Africa's 3–38 loss to Ireland and 18–17 win over France on the end-of-year-tour, Etzebeth was finally subbed off for the first time in 2017 where he was replaced by Franco Mostert in a 35–6 win over Italy. Etzebeth was subbed off at half-time in the final test of 2017 where South Africa lost 22–24 against Wales, picking up a back injury.

In addition to full international matches, Etzebeth has played in non-cap matches against a World XV in Cape Town 2015 and the Barbarians in London in 2016.

Etzebeth was named in South Africa's squad for the 2019 Rugby World Cup. South Africa went on to win the tournament, defeating England in the final.

On the 16th July 2022, Etzebeth won his 100th cap for South Africa in a 30–14 win over Wales becoming only the 7th Springbok to reach this milestone.

Springbok statistics

Test Match Record

Pld = Games Played, W = Games Won, D = Games Drawn, L = Games Lost, Tri = Tries Scored, Pts = Points Scored

Test tries

Super Rugby statistics

Personal life
As of March 2022, Etzebeth is engaged to the singer Anlia van Rensburg, who also sang the South African national anthem on Etzebeth's 100th test cap.

Notes

References

External links
 

Living people
1991 births
South African rugby union players
South Africa international rugby union players
Stormers players
Western Province (rugby union) players
Rugby union locks
Rugby union players from Cape Town
Afrikaner people
South Africa Under-20 international rugby union players
NTT DoCoMo Red Hurricanes Osaka players
South African expatriate rugby union players
South African expatriate sportspeople in Japan
Expatriate rugby union players in Japan
Sharks (rugby union) players